Strawberry Mountain may refer to one of 14 peaks in the United States:

See also
Strawberry Peak